Tregeare is a hamlet in the parish of Egloskerry in Cornwall, England, United Kingdom. To the east is the hill Tregearedown Beacon.

Tregeare Rounds is an Iron Age earthwork half a mile northeast of Pendoggett in the parish of St Kew. An area with a diameter of 500 ft is enclosed by two banks and ditches. As it is overlooked by higher ground to the northwest it may have been used as a cattle enclosure rather than a fortification.

References

Hamlets in Cornwall